Pradnya Paramitha Chandra Devy Rusady or better known as Paramitha Rusady (born August 11, 1966, in Makassar, South Sulawesi, Indonesia), is an Indonesian actress, singer and presenter of Sundanese descent.

Career
She was born in Makassar, August 16, 1966. Her parents are Raden Mas Yus Rusady Wirahaditenaya and Raden Ayu Mary Zumarya, a dance teacher.

Rusady has worked as a model and singer, as well as an actress in films and soap operas. In her youth, she starred in the romance movie Ranjau-Ranjau Cinta, along with Rano Karno. She appeared in the documentary Dibawah Nyiur Melambai and in Si Kabayan, paired with Didi Petet. After a long hiatus, she returned to acting in 2011, appearing in the soap opera Anugerah.

As a teenager she played musical instruments and wrote a number of songs. In 2009 she released the single "Bulan Ke Tiga".

Personal life
On June 23, 2000, she married Gunawan, a soap opera actor who was seven years younger than her. They divorced in October 2002 without having children. On May 20, 2004, she married Nenad Bago of Croatia. He changed his name to Muhammad Hamzah Akbar after converting to Islam. They have one son, and divorced in 2012.

Discography

Studio albums
 Jatuh Hati (1988)
 Nona Manis (3 Dara ; with Ita Purnamasari and Sylvana Herman) (1990)
 Malam Minggu (3 Dara ; with Ita Purnamasari and Sylvana Herman) (1991)
 Tanpa Dirimu (1991)
 Hanya Cinta (3 Dara ; with Ita Purnamasari and Sylvana Herman) (1993)
 Tiada Lagi Asmara (1994)
 Sakral Cinta (2000)
 Best of the Best Paramitha Rusady (2003)
 Part Of Your World – EP (2018)

Compilation albums
 Datang Kembali (1992)
 Jangan Ada Air Mata (1996)
 Kidung (3 Bidadari ; with Desy Ratnasari and Yuni Shara) (1999)

Soundtrack albums
 Ost. Merpati Tak Pernah Ingkar Janji (with Adi Bing Slamet) (1986)
 Ost. Janjiku (1997)
 Ost. Karmila (1998)

Filmography

Film

Television

Television film

Awards and nominations

References

External links
 profilnya di indonesiaselebriti
 Situs Resmi
 profilnya di disctarra
 beritanya di kompas
 beritanya di suaramerdeka
 beritanya di detikhot
 profilnya di indosinema
 profilnya di indosinema
 beritanya di pikiran-rakyat

1966 births
Indonesian actresses
20th-century Indonesian women singers
People from Makassar
Sundanese people
Living people